Isanthrene crabroniformis is a moth of the subfamily Arctiinae. It was described by Otto Staudinger in 1876. It is found in Panama and Colombia.

References

Euchromiina
Moths described in 1876